Mister Mind is a supervillain appearing in American comic books published by DC Comics. Created by Otto Binder and C. C. Beck for Fawcett Comics, he made a cameo appearance in Captain Marvel Adventures #22 (March 1943) before making his full first appearance in Captain Marvel Adventures #26 (August 1943). One of Captain Marvel's greatest enemies, Mister Mind is a two-inch alien caterpillar of high intelligence with telepathic powers who usually carries out his villainous plans through an organization called the Monster Society of Evil. The Monster Society of Evil made its debut in Captain Marvel Adventures #22, and the resulting "Monster Society of Evil" story arc continued for two years in Captain Marvel Adventures, ending with issue #46 (May 1945).

Mister Mind appears in the DC Extended Universe films Shazam! and Shazam! Fury of the Gods, portrayed in CGI and voiced by director David F. Sandberg.

Publication history

Fawcett Comics
After a brief appearance in issue #26, Mister Mind is eventually revealed in Captain Marvel Adventures #27 to be a cartoonish alien worm with spectacles and a talkbox around his neck to amplify his voice.

Despite his small size, Mister Mind continues to use his powers of intellect and telepathy to battle Captain Marvel in subsequent chapters of the serial, eventually recruiting numerous other allies ranging from Alligator-Men to Adolf Hitler and Benito Mussolini. "The Monster Society of Evil" serial concluded with Captain Marvel Adventures #46 (1945), in which Mind is finally captured, tried, and executed for crimes against humanity at the Nuremberg Trials.

DC Comics
Fawcett ceased publication of Captain Marvel comics after settling a lawsuit from DC Comics in 1953. Twenty years later, DC acquired the rights to publish its own Captain Marvel stories under the title Shazam!, as well as the reprint rights to the Fawcett material. Mister Mind was reintroduced in a new story in Shazam! #2 (1973), which explained that he had survived his execution and hid while Captain Marvel and his allies were stuck in suspended animation for 20 years. Mister Mind would appear regularly as part of Captain Marvel's rogues gallery in his adventures in Shazam and World's Finest Comics through the 1970s and early 1980s. Mind also appeared, often with some form of the Monster Society of Evil, as a guest villain in other DC publications such as Justice League of America and DC Comics Presents. The final appearance of Mister Mind and the Monster Society of Evil in the original DC/Fawcett continuity was in All-Star Squadron #51–54 (November 1985 to February 1986), an arc written by Roy & Dann Thomas that was chronologically Mind's first appearance and revealed the origin of his hatred of humans and superheroes.

DC reset its comics' continuity with the 12-issue miniseries Crisis on Infinite Earths in 1985–86, and Mister Mind disappeared from DC publications for a decade. He re-emerged in The Power of Shazam! #13 (March 1996), now a more realistically depicted caterpillar-like being from the planet Venus possessing powers which include mind control, telepathy, and mental image projection. This Mind was the main villain of the second major story arc of The Power of Shazam!, and was depicted as the lead scout of a race of Venusian worms looking to conquer the Earth. While Captain Marvel eventually destroys the other worms, Mind survives and becomes a recurring villain in The Power of Shazam!, JSA, and other DC publications, often forming a Monster Society of Evil to do his bidding as in the original serial. The weekly maxiseries 52 (2006-2007) featured Mister Mind as the series' final major adversary. In this story, Mind gains the ability to evolve into a gigantic "Hyperfly", able to eat space and time and inadvertently creating a new DC Multiverse in the process.

Following 52, Mind appeared irregularly as a supervillain in DC comic series such as Action Comics, Booster Gold, and more. In 2007, cartoonist Jeff Smith, the creator of Bone, wrote and illustrated a four-issue miniseries, Shazam! The Monster Society of Evil, which offered an updated take on the classic Fawcett story.

In 2011, DC again reset its continuity with The New 52. In subsequent stories, Mister Mind has appeared sparingly, mostly in cameo appearances as in Justice League #21 (2013) and Convergence: Shazam! #2 (2015). He currently appears as one of the villains in DC's current Shazam! ongoing comic series, with his first appearance in Shazam! #2 (March 2019).

Fictional character biography (chronological)

Pre-Crisis

Earth-Two
Mister Mind came to Earth during World War II, drawn by its radio broadcasts; he especially loved Edgar Bergen's dummy Charlie McCarthy. Upon learning that his beloved Charlie was not real, he decided to conquer the world instead. To this end, he formed the first Monster Society of Evil, which was merely a shadow of what was to come. He gathered known villains like Dummy, Mister Who, Nyola, Oom the Mighty, and Ramulus to make up the Monster Society of Evil. They succeeded in capturing Hawkgirl. Not long after its founding, the other villains tried to kill him and Mister Mind retreated to Earth-S. Without his leadership, the team was quickly defeated in battle by the All-Star Squadron.

Captain Marvel Adventures: "The Monster Society of Evil" (Earth-S)
As a side-effect of the reality-altering Crisis on Infinite Earths, Mister Mind arrived in the universe of Earth-S (where Fawcett's former characters dwelled) sometime around 1846 (it was mentioned in this story that he had been working on a weapon for 97 years). His brilliant intellect, telepathic powers, and ruthlessness allowed him to conquer much of space, establishing bases on many different worlds as well as varied locations on Earth. He recruited supervillains, armies, and entire alien species to aid him in his attempt to conquer the Earth, and first relayed his information from the planetoid Punkus via radio. He began his reign of terror on Earth in 1943, boasting that he and the Monster Society of Evil would give Captain Marvel "nightmares from now on". This formed the basis of the plot for "The Monster Society of Evil" serial in Captain Marvel Adventures #22–46 (March 1943 to May 1945). Mind was not revealed as a worm until Captain Marvel Adventures #26.

Mind had many and varied plans to conquer Earth, and to destroy Captain Marvel and/or his teenaged alter-ego, Billy Batson. But Captain Marvel stopped all of Mind's plans, dismantled all of his resources, and arrested, frightened away, or accidentally killed all of his henchmen. Reverse cliffhangers were used in the Monster Society stories, such as Mister Mind about to be crushed under a careless heel or about to be crushed in a paper roller. Finally, a desperate Mister Mind attacked Captain Marvel's alter ego Billy Batson with ether and left him unconscious. But he then realized that without his henchmen, he was practically helpless and unable to kill him. Captain Marvel soon captured the world's wickedest worm and had him tried and executed for killing 186,744 people.

Shazam!: Return of the Society
Shazam! #2 was Mister Mind's first appearance in a DC comic, and depicted his return to villainy. Although he had been sentenced to death in the electric chair, Mister Mind's alien physiology proved resistant to the high voltage, and he entered a state of suspended animation that was mistaken for death. On the verge of being stuffed for display in a museum, he awakened, hypnotized the taxidermist into creating a duplicate, and escaped.

Shortly after Captain Marvel's own return from suspended animation, he countered Mister Mind trying to destroy the country with an expanding balloon-like weapon in St. Louis. With intelligence from a reformed Herkimer, Marvel succeeds in thwarting Mind's plan and capturing the worm.

Several future issues of Shazam! depict Mister Mind attempting to recruit new henchmen and reform the Monster Society of Evil, at one point even recruiting a displaced Lex Luthor from Earth-One. The Monster Society of Evil was briefly reformed in Shazam! #14 (September–October 1974).

An escaped Mister Mind, hungry for revenge, assembled a new, smaller group which included Doctor Sivana, his evil children Georgia and Sivana Jr, and Ibac. They attempted to attack the Marvel Family - Captain Marvel, Mary Marvel, and Captain Marvel Jr. - with a death ray that created "dream" monsters using first evil thoughts and later the nightmares of Uncle Marvel. The Marvels end up defeating the Monster Society by convincing Uncle Marvel to dream up "dream" versions of the Marvels to fight the monsters.

World's Finest Comics: The Monster Society Strikes Back
Mister Mind reformed his Monster Society of Evil one last time in the classic continuity, in World's Finest Comics #264–267 (August–September 1980 to February–March 1981). Almost the entire Marvel Family had to unite to stop them—Captain Marvel, Mary Marvel, Captain Marvel Jr., and the three Lieutenant Marvels: Tall Marvel, Fat Marvel, and Hill Marvel. Their wicked plans were wide-ranging, beginning with an assault on Egypt, expanding to a scheme to reverse the entire Earth's topography, Oggar raising an evil army from the sands and dusts of Egypt for Black Adam to lead, and conquering hundreds of planets and using them to build an army of spaceships. Their plans culminated in a massive assault on the Rock of Eternity, home of the Marvels' benefactor, the wizard Shazam.

World's Funnest
In the Elseworlds story Superman & Batman: World's Funnest (November 2000), the two near-omnipotent imps Mister Mxyzptlk and Bat-Mite engage in a tremendous duel that destroys many planes of reality. One of these appears to be a version of Earth-S. During their time there, they run into a version of the Monster Society of Evil that is slightly different from any other, featuring many of Captain Marvel's enemies. Mxyzptlk easily destroys them (with a tentacled beast labeled Mr. Mxyzptlk's Anti-Social Monster) when they begin to annoy him, along with the rest of the universe; however, by the end of the book, all is returned to what it was.

Post-Crisis

Shazam! A New Beginning
Mister Mind's return to the DC Universe in wake of Crisis was first hinted at in Roy Thomas' Shazam! A New Beginning. It closed with a defeated Dr. Sivana hiding out and drinking tequila in a Mexican dive bar. He ponders how he will defeat Captain Marvel when he sees a worm in the bottle and has the idea of using it as a weapon against the hero.

Thomas' idea of Mister Mind being a mutated tequila worm was not followed up on and he was given a different origin in his next appearance.

The Power of Shazam!

Mister Mind was fully re-introduced into the DC Universe in Jerry Ordway's The Power of Shazam! series in 1996. Mind was one of a race of millions of mind-controlling worms from the planet Venus, who had plans to invade and take over the Earth, which they claim to have once ruled around the Ice Age. Appointed as the go-ahead agent, Mind arrived on Earth during World War II, by means of an indestructible green Venusian space suit, but was captured by Bulletman, Starman, and Green Lantern Abin Sur before enacting his plan. Mind eventually escaped, stowing away on the Magellan space probe, and decades later forced Doctor Sivana to join forces with him, needing Sivana's scientific prowess to facilitate the Venusian worms' plans. He took control of the wealthy Sinclair Batson to finance those plans.

The worms' plans to invade the Earth were thwarted by Captain Marvel and Mary Marvel, who succeeded in killing all of the worms by sending them into deep space where they froze, save for Mister Mind, whom they placed in the custody of Sergeant Steel and the Department of Metahuman Affairs. Mind eventually escapes, takes over Steel's mind, and programs the robot Mister Atom, another Marvel Family villain in Steel's custody, to destroy the town of Fairfield, where Billy Batson (Captain Marvel) and Mary Bromfield (Mary Marvel) lived with their adopted parents. After Mister Atom's nuclear blast destroys the city and kills nearly all of its residents, the Marvels arrive in Washington, DC seeking revenge. Mister Mind's plot to set off a nuclear holocaust included using clones of himself to take over the minds of several regular American citizens, who were to make their ways to nuclear bomb facilities and initiate a nuclear holocaust. However, Mind's plan was foiled by the Marvel Family and Green Lanterns Kyle Rayner and Hal Jordan.

52
Mister Mind played an integral role in DC's year-long 2006-2007 weekly comic, 52, although the importance of his role in the series was revealed gradually over time and involved the concepts of time travel and temporal paradoxes.

The day following the end of the Infinite Crisis event, Dr. Sivana discovers Mister Mind lying in a crater in the desert and pockets him, sealing him in a specimen jar and taking it back to his laboratory to prevent him from interfering with his plans to take over the world. Sivana bombards Mind with particles of Suspendium, a time-altering element introduced in the 1970s Shazam! title. Although Sivana is then kidnapped by Intergang and forced to join their Science Squad, the Suspendium induces Mister Mind's delayed metamorphosis. As Sivana is dragged off, Mind observes a televised memorial for the heroes lost in the Infinite Crisis, and takes particular note of Skeets, the robotic companion of the time-traveling superhero Booster Gold. With his metamorphosis beginning, Mind proceeds to weave a cocoon around himself, which doubles as a matter transporter that he uses to beam himself inside Skeets in Dr. Magnus' lab, intending to use the robot as a "cradle" where he can spend the following year gestating and completing his transformation.

Destroying Skeets from within, Mind adopts his identity and makes plans to consume the Multiverse, which had returned to existence as a result of Infinite Crisis. Discovering that Rip Hunter is aware of his plans, Mind, as Skeets, attempts to hunt him down and draw him out, to no avail. Eventually, he discovers Hunter hiding in the bottle city of Kandor, but when Hunter turns the Phantom Zone projector on him, Mind overpowers it and "eats" the Phantom Zone itself. At the end of the year, Mind tracks Hunter and Booster down to the lab of T. O. Morrow, intent on acquiring the head of the Red Tornado, whose computerized brain has mapped the Multiverse. There, Mind's gestation completes and he emerges from within Skeets in a monstrous imago form known as a "Hyperfly". Now, instead of feeding on the brainwaves of individuals, he feeds on space-time itself and decides to devour the entire Multiverse. Booster and Hunter flee back in time to the moment of the Multiverse's birth, with the now-gigantic Mind in pursuit, following them from universe to universe, all 52 of them, where he consumes portions of each world's history, altering their timelines and creating 52 new, distinct Earths. Mind is lured back to Hunter's lab, where he shrinks in size and becomes trapped within Skeets' Suspendium-lined shell. Booster hurls Mind backwards through time, where the Suspendium reverts Mind back to his larval form, and lands on the day after the end of Infinite Crisis, where he is found by Dr. Sivana and sealed in the jar. The remaining 52 seconds of time are used to bind him in a time loop.

Also during the series, unrelated to Mind's activities, a new incarnation of the Monster Society was formed, consisting of the Four Horsemen of Apokolips, creatures engineered by Intergang's Science Squad (including Sivana). Of particular note is Sobek, a humanoid crocodile not unlike the beings who were members of the Pre-Crisis Monster Society. This Monster Society attacked the Black Marvel Family for not joining the Freedom of Power treaty, and killed Isis and Osiris, only to be destroyed by Black Adam, save for Death, who flees. In his hunt for Death, Black Adam destroys the nation of Bialya, before defeating the final Horseman, torturing it for information, and killing it.

Shazam! The Monster Society of Evil (2007)
A new Captain Marvel prestige format four-issue limited series from DC Comics, Shazam! The Monster Society of Evil, written and illustrated by Jeff Smith (creator of Bone) began publication on February 7, 2007. Smith's Shazam! miniseries, in the works since 2003, is a more traditional take on the character, returning Captain Marvel to his roots with a story set outside of the DC Universe. In this version, Mister Mind resembles a small snake, with a more threatening face sans glasses, while wearing a modern style communicator headset. Many different monsters are shown in the Society, with the Crocodile-Men being replaced with the Alligator-Men.

The New 52
In September 2011, The New 52 rebooted DC's continuity. In this new timeline, Mister Mind makes his first appearance after Doctor Sivana's alliance with Black Adam fails. Sivana heads to the Rock of Eternity, where he cannot get in because of a magical shield. He cries out for someone to help him save his family, saying that while science has failed them, magic could save them. Sivana then discovers a caterpillar-like creature trapped in a bottle within the Rock. The creature claims that people call him "Mister Mind" and makes note that he and Doctor Sivana shall be the "best of friends".

DC Rebirth
Mister Mind returns in the new Shazam! series during the "DC Rebirth," still in an alliance with Sivana. Residing inside of Sivana's ear, Mister Mind has Sivana go to a doctor's office to cut out the tongue of a "medicine man" as it is needed for a spell. It is revealed that Mister Mind's real name is Maxivermis Mind and is believed to have originated from the Wildlands, one of the seven realms in the Magiclands. Believed to originally be a simple bookworm, Mister Mind suffered abuse as a child and tried for years to break into the Library of Eternity. He eventually succeeded and after absorbing all the knowledge and power of countless spells, he returned to the Wildlands and took his revenge on those who he believed had wronged him. Achieving his revenge, he set his sights on the Council of Eternity. He managed to work his way inside the Council and it took the combined might of Solomon, Hercules, Atlas, Zeus, Achilles, Mercury, and ! to contain Mister Mind, but he was able to cause the death of Solomon. Mind's goal is to consume and control all the power of the Magiclands.

Mister Mind and Doctor Sivana plan to head to the Monsterlands to build the Monster Society of Evil from its inhabitants. As King Kid fights the Shazam Family in Philadelphia, Doctor Sivana and Mister Mind are directed to a boat by Dummy who cannot accompany them since he cannot deal with water. When they arrive at the Dungeon of Eternity, Mister Mind states that the inmates of the Dungeon of Eternity were gathered from all over the Magiclands and imprisoned for challenging the Council of Wizards. In addition, Mister Mind stated that the Monsterlands used to be called the Gods' Realm until the day of Black Adam's betrayal which led them to strip the gods of their powers and close the doors to the Magiclands. They find a small prison containing Superboy-Prime in the Monsterlands as Superboy-Prime states that he can hear what Mister Mind is saying. Mister Mind and Doctor Sivana begin their plans to free the Monster Society of Evil from the Dungeon of Eternity. 

Mister Mind senses the fight between the Shazam Family and Mamaragan as he instructs Doctor Sivana to stab his magical eye with a dagger which starts to melt the doors to the cells holding the Monster Society of Evil. Then Mister Mind started to control C.C. revealing to Billy that he is using him as a host and not Doctor Sivana. Mister Mind states to the Shazam Family that he plans to use C.C. to unite the Magiclands under his rule. He then proceeds to summon the Monster Society of Evil leaving Dummy behind who is tricked by Superboy-Prime into freeing him. Shazam faces off against a Mister Mind-controlled C.C. Batson while the others fight the Monster Society of Evil. During the fight, Scapegoat and Red Queen ask when they are going to get a turn. Mister Mind states that they will get their chance when the Magiclands are united.

Mister Mind states to Shazam that it took him and Doctor Sivana awhile to find C.C. Batson. When Doctor Sivana uses a spell on Victor and Rosa Vasquez to get what Mister Mind wants, Shazam asks what that is. Speaking through C.C., Mister Mind states that he wants what Mamaragan and his Council of Wizards denied him years ago....access to the magic of the Seven Magiclands. When Tawky Tawny tries to help Shazam, Mister Mind has C.C. turn him into a cub. Then he has Doctor Sivana summon the Book of Champions from the Rock of Eternity. Mister Mind then has Shazam read the spells on the pages in exchange for sparing Victor and Rosa. Complying with Mister Mind, Shazam reads "Seven lands. Seven wars. Seven locks. Seven doors. Magic realms hidden now, show yourself to the Champion and with one final word, the spell is complete! SHAZAM!" 

This causes all the doorways to the Seven Magiclands to be unlocked and obliterated. Using a spell from the Book of Champions, Shazam shrinks himself with the Subtraxerim spell and enters C.C.'s head to confront Mister Mind. Shazam confronts Mister Mind inside C.C.'s head and engages him in a magic battle. To prevent Mister Mind from casting spells, Shazam punches his talkbox enough to emit energy that knocks out the Monster Society of Evil. After using the Corpus Magnum spell to grow, Shazam works to undo Mister Mind's spell only for Superboy-Prime to interfere. He was able to undo the spell after he and Black Adam defeated Superboy-Prime.

Powers and abilities
Mister Mind was Earth's most formidable psychic extraterrestrial, easily able to take control of an individual's mind, as well as induce telepathic activity. He possesses many insect-related abilities, such as the ability to spin very unique silk at speeds faster than any eye can see, plus encasing a human in his cocoon within seconds. Mister Mind has psychokinetic powers strong enough to pummel mystical champions and level several story buildings by a thought. Him being a master strategist who could masterfully manipulate anyone into doing everything he desires, even with or without his mental capabilities. 

Apparently very long-lived, Mister Mind's current body is also only the larval stage of his breed. He briefly reaches maturity and evolves into a Hyperfly that manipulates reality, feeds on the timelines of singular universes, and traverses space, including dimensions with relative ease. After forcibly rejuvenated himself back into his pupal stage, Mister Mind apparently retains the capability to reproduce asexually, thus using a host for breeding these identical siblings. He can also adjust his size and mass at will or psionically influence technology from galaxies far away. 

His new interpretation in the "DC Rebirth" continuum have been granted mastery of magic (via knowledge absorption) who had lived for untold millennia.

Other versions
 In Mark Waid and Alex Ross's 1996 miniseries Kingdom Come, Dr. Sivana was credited by Lex Luthor for creating a breed of mind-controlling worms before his death. Also in Superman's gulag, many of the prisoners were members of the Pre-Crisis Monster Societies, such as Jeepers, Mister Banjo, King Kull, the Crocodile Men, Ibac, and Goat-Man.
 In Jim Krueger, Doug Braithwaite and Alex Ross's series Justice, Dr. Sivana uses mind-controlling robots based on Mister Mind.

In other media

Television
 Mister Mind appears in The Kid Super Power Hour with Shazam!, voiced by Lou Scheimer. In his most notable appearance, he is stricken with an inferiority complex as bigger villains never take him seriously.
 Mister Mind appears in the Batman: The Brave and the Bold episode "The Malicious Mister Mind!", voiced by Greg Ellis. He takes control of the Monster Society of Evil from Doctor Sivana to battle Batman and the Marvel Family. Seeking revenge, Sivana attempts to use a death ray he was constructing on Mind, only to learn too late that the latter modified it into a growth ray. Nonetheless, Batman reverses the effect before defeating the villains.
 Mister Mind appears in the "Shazam!" segment of DC Nation Shorts, voiced by Eric Bauza.
 Mister Mind appears in Justice League Action, voiced by Oliver Vaquer. This version sports a radio that he uses to communicate with others.
 Mister Mind appears in the Teen Titans Go! episode "Little Elvis", voiced by Scott Menville. This version has a childlike and goofy personality in keeping with the series' tone.

Film
 Mister Mind appears in the DC Extended Universe (DCEU) film Shazam!, voiced by an uncredited David F. Sandberg, who also served as the director. Initially imprisoned in the Rock of Eternity, he escapes amidst Thaddeus Sivana's attack on the wizard Shazam. In the mid-credits scene, Mister Mind approaches an imprisoned Sivana to propose an alliance to take over the Seven Realms.
 Mister Mind appears in Lego DC: Shazam!: Magic and Monsters, voiced again by Greg Ellis. This version is the leader of the Monster Society of Evil who seeks to metamorphose into a giant moth.
 Mister Mind appears in the post-credit scene of the DCEU film Shazam! Fury of the Gods with Sandberg reprising his role. He reappears before Doctor Sivanna after disappearing for two years as he states that visiting him takes a long time. Sivanna asks him if they can finally get to work on their master plan, Mister Mind agrees, but mentions he has to take care of one more thing, slowly slithering out of his cell and leaving Sivanna frustrated in anger.

References

External links
 Mr. Mind at Comic Vine

Characters created by C. C. Beck
Characters created by Otto Binder
Comics characters introduced in 1943
DC Comics aliens
DC Comics extraterrestrial supervillains
DC Comics film characters
DC Comics supervillains 
DC Comics characters who have mental powers
DC Comics characters who are shapeshifters
DC Comics characters who use magic
DC Comics telekinetics 
DC Comics telepaths
Fawcett Comics supervillains 
Fictional characters who can change size
Fictional characters who can duplicate themselves
Fictional characters who can manipulate reality
Fictional characters who can manipulate time
Fictional characters with dimensional travel abilities
Fictional characters with slowed ageing
Fictional characters with spirit possession or body swapping abilities
Fictional characters with superhuman durability or invulnerability
Fictional hypnotists and indoctrinators
Fictional flies
Fictional mass murderers
Fictional parasites and parasitoids
Fictional technopaths
Fictional Venusians
Fictional worms
Golden Age supervillains
Captain Marvel (DC Comics)

de:Captain Marvel#Mister Mind